The 2016 National Women's Soccer League season was the fourth season of the National Women's Soccer League, the top division of women's soccer in the United States. Including the NWSL's two professional predecessors, Women's Professional Soccer (2009–2011) and the Women's United Soccer Association (2001–2003), it was the tenth overall season of FIFA and USSF-sanctioned top division women's soccer in the United States. The league is operated by the United States Soccer Federation and receives major financial backing from that body. Further financial backing is expected to be provided by the Canadian Soccer Association. Both national federations pay the league salaries of many of their respective national team members in an effort to nurture talent in those nations.

To accommodate the 2016 Olympics the league suspended play for most of the month of August.  In addition, the league did not schedule games during FIFA windows, leaving the 20-game, 19-week regular season ending in late September for the second year in a row.

Teams, stadiums, and personnel

Stadiums and locations 

Two teams, the Dash and Reign, do not make their stadiums' entire capacity available for home games, instead restricting ticket sales at a lower level. The full capacities of their venues are included in parentheses and italics.

Personnel and sponsorship 

Note: All of the teams use Nike as their kit manufacturer.

Competition format 

 Each team will play a total of 20 games, 10 home and 10 away.
 Each team will play all opponents twice, once home and once away, plus one local rival two extra times, also once home and away.
 The four teams at the end of the season with the most points will qualify for the playoffs.

Results table 

Updated to games played on September 25, 2016.

Scores listed as home-away

League standings

Tiebreakers 

The initial determining factor for a team's position in the standings is most points earned, with three points earned for a win, one point for a draw, and zero points for a loss. If two or more teams tie in point total, when determining rank and playoff qualification and seeding, the NWSL uses the following tiebreaker rules, going down the list until all teams are ranked.

 Head-to-head win–loss record between the teams (or points-per-game if more than two teams).
 Greater goal difference across the entire season (against all teams, not just tied teams).
 Greatest total number of goals scored (against all teams).
 Apply #1–3 to games played on the road.
 Apply #1–3 to games played at home.
 If teams are still equal, ranking will be determined by a coin toss.
NOTE: If two clubs remain tied after another club with the same number of points advances during any step, the tie breaker reverts to step 1 of the two-club format.

Weekly live standings 

Considering each week to end on a Sunday. The number of games played by the teams are uneven due to a weather postponement in week 7 (rescheduled as the only game between week 15 and 16) and differing schedules between week 10 and 16.

Attendance

Average home attendances

Ranked from highest to lowest average attendance.

Updated to games played on September 25, 2016.

Highest attendances 
Regular season

Updated to games played on September 25, 2016.

Statistical leaders

Top scorers

Updated: September 25

Top assists 

Updated: September 25

Clean Sheets

Updated: September 25

NWSL Playoffs 

The top four teams from the regular season will compete for the NWSL Championship.

Semi-finals

Championship

Individual awards

Monthly awards

Weekly awards

Annual awards

References 

Individual weekly awards

External links 

 
2016
1